The University of Engineering and Technology, Taxila (UET Taxila) is a public university located in Taxila, Punjab, Pakistan. It was established in 1975 as a campus of the University of Engineering and Technology, Lahore and chartered as an independent university in 1993. It offers bachelor's, master's and doctoral degrees in engineering and applied sciences.

Recognized university
University of Engineering and Technology, Taxila is officially recognized by the Higher Education Commission of Pakistan.

History
With the increase in student enrollment in the 1970s in University of Engineering and Technology, Lahore, a constituent college of the university named University College of Engineering and Technology was built in Sahiwal in 1975. For three years, it functioned at Sahiwal and in 1978, it was shifted to its permanent location at Taxila. The college continued under the administrative control of the University of Engineering and Technology, Lahore until October 1993 when it received a charter as an independent university under the University of Engineering and Technology Taxila Ordinance of 1993. Enrollment of undergraduate and postgraduate students is about 5,000.

Location
The campus is located on the outskirts of Taxila,  from the city. It is situated near the railway station Mohra Shah Wali Shah on the Taxila-Havelian branch line. There are some remnants of the ancient civilization of Taxila around the main campus. These include the Jandial Temple, the city of Sirkap, Bhir Mound, the ruins of the Dharmarajika Stupa, the monastery at Jaulian and the monastery at Mohra Muradu, Taxila museum. 

Faculties and departments

The university consists of following faculties and departments:

Faculty of Electronic and Electrical Engineering
 Department of Electrical Engineering
 Department of Electronics Engineering
 Department of Energy Engineering
 Department of Electronics Engineering (Chakwal campus)

Faculty of Mechanical and Aeronautical Engineering
 Department of Mechanical Engineering
 Department of Mechatronics Engineering
 Department of Aeronautical Engineering

Faculty of Telecommunication and Information Engineering
 Department of Computer Engineering
 Department of Software Engineering
 Department of Telecommunication Engineering
 Department of Computer Science

Faculty of Civil and Environmental Engineering
 Department of Civil Engineering
 Department of Environmental Engineering

Faculty of Industrial Engineering
 Department of Industrial Engineering
 Department of Engineering Management

Faculty of Basic Sciences and Humanities
 Department of Basic Sciences

Taxila Institute of Transportation Engineering

The Taxila Institute of Transportation Engineering (TITE) was established by the Department of Electrical Engineering to develop innovative methods, materials and technologies for improving transportation efficiency, safety and reliability. TITE has launched short courses called highway material engineer and highway material technician for highway engineers, material engineers and laboratory technicians. These courses are designed to increase the competency of these professions.

Library

Central Library
The central library has a web-based library automation system named UET LIBAS. The Central Library has a seating capacity for 400 readers. The library remains open in 2 shifts from 8:00 am to 9:00 pm on all working days with usual break. The library has 63,501 volumes of books and 45,000 volumes of bound serials. Besides engineering subjects, there is material on humanities, social sciences and Islamic Studies. The library houses a Book Bank, which lends textbooks to undergraduates for long periods on a nominal rent. Books which are in excess of the requirements of the Book Bank, are sold to the students on a no-profit no-loss basis through its Co-operative Bookstore.

Digital Library
The university belongs to Pakistan Educational Research Network (PERN) which connects universities and research institutes in Pakistan through the internet. The Higher Education Commission has given online access to journals and research papers through PERN, so that they will have digital access to quality research materials. Access to all of these resources is free for students and researchers within the university intranet.

Sports
A student common room is provided in each of the hostels with facilities for indoor games such as basketball, shooting ball, squash, table tennis, badminton and carrom. Outdoor games include cricket, hockey, volleyball and football. Other sports available are boxing, karate, athletics and bodybuilding. University holds a sports gala week every year.

Student societies
 Society of Innovative Electrical Professionals (SIEP)
 Student Counselling and Guidance Bureau (SCGB)
 American Society of Safety Professionals (ASSP)
 Quaid-e-Azam Debating Society (QDS)
 Association for Computing Machinery (ACM) Chapter, UET Taxila
 Environment Protection Society (EPS)
 Institute of Electrical and Electronics Engineers (IEEE), Student Branch, UET Taxila (IEEE-UET Taxila)
 American Society of Mechanical Engineers (ASME), UET Taxila Chapter (ASME UET Taxila)
 American Society of Heating, Refrigerating and Air-Conditioning Engineers (ASHRAE)
 Institution of Mechanical Engineers (IMechE), UET Taxila Chapter (IMechE UET Taxila)
 Institute of Industrial and Systems Engineers (IISE), UET Taxila Chapter (IISE UET Taxila)
 Institution of Civil Engineers (ICE) Student Chapter UET Taxila
 American Society of Civil Engineers (ASCE), UET Taxila Chapter (ASCE UET Taxila)
 Taxilian Robotics and Automation Club (TRAC)
 The Society of Computer Technology (COMPTECH)

Alumni Association
Alumni association is a link between the alumni and institute.

Health Facilities
University provides medical facilities to its employees and students.

Transport

Transport service is provided for students with buses traveling between Rawalpindi, Islamabad, Hassan Abdal, Wah Cantt and the campus.

Hostels

 Quad-e-Azam Hall
 Iqbal Hall
 Ali Hall
 Umar Hall
 Usman Hall
 Ayesha Hall
 Abubakkar Hall
 Jabar Bin Hayan Hall

Central Mosque

There is a central mosque, also known as Mosque Bilal, that has a capacity for 700 worshipers.

Sub campus
The university opened its second campus in Chakwal in 2005. It became an independent university (University of Chakwal) in 2020. Another campus is planned in Pind Dadan Khan, Jhelum District.

See also
 Taxila, ancient city

References

External links

 UET Taxila official website
 Digital Library UET Taxila

1975 establishments in Pakistan
Educational institutions established in 1975
Engineering universities and colleges in Pakistan
Public universities and colleges in Punjab, Pakistan
Universities and colleges in Rawalpindi District
Taxila Tehsil